The King of Mask Singer is a South Korean singing competition program presented by Kim Sung-joo, with introductions by voice actor . It airs on MBC on Sunday, starting from April 5, 2015 as a part of MBC's Sunday Night programming block.

Format
Each competition lasts for two episodes, with the singers competing one-on-one in three elimination rounds. They are given elaborate masks which are made by designer  and gloves to wear in order to conceal their identity, thus removing factors such as popularity, career and age that could lead to prejudiced voting. In the first round, both contestants sing the same song, while in the second and third round they each sing a solo song. The winners of each pair are selected by the audience and panel of celebrities through instant live votes. The identities of the singers are not revealed until they have been eliminated. The winner of the third round challenges the previous competition's Mask King, and is either eliminated or becomes the new Mask King. Ha Hyun-woo of Guckkasten ("Music Captain of Our Local") has nine consecutive wins, which is the highest number of wins achieved by any contestant (and highest number of males) and Son Seung-yeon ("The East Invincibility") has eight consecutive wins, which is the highest number of consecutive wins ever achieved by a female contestant.

Due to great interest and demand, the show released a special album consisting of a selection of studio recordings by the competitors.

Competitors

List of idol contestants performed in this show, include the ex-idols and exclude the sub-groups (initial sort by group)
 – Idol group has been disbanded
 – Idol group is on hiatus

Panel of celebrities

List of Masked Kings

List of finalists before the Final's battle

Ratings

2015

2016

2017

2018

2019

2020

2021

2022

Records and statistics

About Mask King

Top three Mask King

Top Mask King per year

Contestant crowned "Mask King" during the second try

Contestant crowned "Mask King" twice

About votes

Most votes' difference
Total 21 votes

Total 99 votes

Total 199 votes

One vote's difference

Three-hand match (final round)

Unpublished votes (except special live)

About contestants

Top three oldest/youngest contestants

Familial contestants

Foreign contestants

Non-entertainer contestants

Contestant has the same score in every round

About performances

Non-Korean performances

Awards and nominations

Notes

References

External links
 

King of Mask Singer
2015 South Korean television series debuts
Korean-language television shows
MBC TV original programming
South Korean variety television shows
South Korean music television shows
Music competitions in South Korea